The 2018 Tour de France was the 105th edition of Tour de France, one of cycling's Grand Tours. The Tour began in Noirmoutier-en-l'Île with flat stage on 7 July, and Stage 12 occurred on 19 July with a mountainous stage from Bourg-Saint-Maurice. The race finished on the Champs-Élysées in Paris on 29 July.

Classification standings

Stage 12
19 July 2018 – Bourg-Saint-Maurice to Alpe d'Huez, 

The riders departed southwest from Bourg-Saint-Maurice, with racing starting at Bellentre. After descending to the valley floor at La Chambre, the riders turned southeast and faced the  climb of the category 2  and descended south to an intermediate sprint at Saint-Jean-de-Maurienne.

Rigoberto Urán withdrew from the race before the start of the stage, having ridden with an injury from Stage 9. The stage was won by Geraint Thomas, becoming the first rider in the race's history to win on the legendary Alpe while wearing the yellow jersey. General classification contender Vincenzo Nibali, who was fourth overall, was forced to withdraw from the Tour following the stage after an incident near the summit of Alpe d'Huez where he fell off his bike. Although he remounted his bike and finished the stage, he was soon transported to hospital in an ambulance and diagnosed with a fractured vertebrae. It was initially suspected that the crash had been caused by a police motorcycle driving in front of him, but it later emerged that he crashed after being caught in a spectator's camera strap. Nibali's team management saw the lack of crowd control from the gendarmerie (French Armed Forces police) and spectators lighting flares as contributing factors. While race director Christian Prudhomme appealed to fans to show the riders more respect, and personally apologised to the team and promised that the safety would be improved in the future. The team management believed the ASO could be held responsible for the incident, and the incident later became a legal matter when Nibali filed a complaint to the French police.

Stage 13
20 July 2018 – Le Bourg-d'Oisans to Valence, 

The stage departed heading north and then downhill west to Vizille. After passing over the category 3 Côte de Brié, the riders turned northwest and descended into Grenoble. The route continued north and then west to an intermediate sprint at Saint-Quentin-sur-Isère. Heading southwest through Rovon, the riders eventually turned southeast to Pont-en-Royans and then south over the category 4 Côte de Sainte-Eulalie-en-Royans. The route then meandered west to Hostun and continued on an uncategorised climb southwest, through Rochefort-Samson, and gradually descending to Peyrus. The race then turned west, heading around the outskirts of Chabeuil, to a flat finish in Valence.

Vincenzo Nibali withdrew from the race before the start of the stage, suffering from a fracture of a vertebra as a consequence of a collision with a spectator on the climbing of the Alpe d'Huez. Until his withdrawal, he was fourth on the general classification.

Stage 14
21 July 2018 – Saint-Paul-Trois-Châteaux to Mende, 

The riders departed west from Saint-Paul-Trois-Châteaux, though Bourg-Saint-Andéol and Vallon-Pont-d'Arc. After heading around the northern side of Sampzon, the route turned southwest to the category 4 Côte du Grand Châtaignier and wound south to an intermediate sprint at Bessèges.

Stage 15
22 July 2018 – Millau to Carcassonne, 

The race departed west from Millau, reaching the category 3 Côte de Luzençon after . After passing through Saint-Affrique and Belmont-sur-Rance, the riders faced the  category 2 climb of the Col de Sié, then descending through Lacaune-les-Bains, Brassac and Boissezon. The route then descended through Cabrespine to Villalier, and continued to a slight uphill finish in Carcassonne.

Rest day 2
23 July 2018 – Carcassonne

Damien Howson retired from the race, due to a wrist fracture sustained during a crash the previous day.

Stage 16
24 July 2018 – Carcassonne to Bagnères-de-Luchon, 

The race departed west from Carcassonne, heading through Montréal to the category 4 Côte de Fanjeaux. After passing through Belpech, the riders reached the category 4 Côte de Pamiers. The route traveled through Le Mas-d'Azil and Lescure, to an intermediate sprint at Saint-Girons.

At  into the stage, the police used tear gas to stop a protest by local farmers who had placed hay bales on the road. When the riders crossed that point, there was still tear gas in the air. The race was neutralized for about 15 minutes because several riders had problems with their eyes and had to rinse them.

Philippe Gilbert led the stage at the descent from the Col de Portet d'Aspet. On the descent, he crashed into a wall and fell down a ravine, but managed to recover himself to continue to the end of the stage. However, on medical inspection of his leg injury, after the stage, he was found unfit to continue the race.

Stage 17
25 July 2018 – Bagnères-de-Luchon to Saint-Lary-Soulan Col de Portet, 

Stage 18
26 July 2018 – Trie-sur-Baïse to Pau, 

The race departed from Trie-sur-Baïse, heading north to Miélan. The riders then continued northwest to Marciac, and then southwest to Maubourguet. After heading northwest and climbing the category 4 Côte de Madiran, the race continued to an intermediate sprint at Aurensan and headed on to Aire-sur-l'Adour. The route then meandered west through Geaune to Samadet and turned southeast. The race then continued through Auriac to the category 4 climb of the Côte d'Anos. The riders continued south to the western outskirts of Morlaàs, before heading southwest to a flat finish in Pau.

Stage 19
27 July 2018 – Lourdes to Laruns, 

The race departed east from Lourdes with racing starting at Arcizac-ez-Angles. The riders then climbed the category 4 Côte de Loucrup, and headed south through Montgaillard to Bagnères-de-Bigorre. The riders continued east through Mauvezin to the category 4 Côte de Capvern-les-Bains. Continuing south, the race eventually reached an intermediate sprint at Sarrancolin. On descending through Luz-Saint-Sauveur, the race then took the road north, through Pierrefitte-Nestalas to the valley floor at Argelès-Gazost. The race then descended through Eaux-Bonnes to the finish line in Laruns.

Stage 20
28 July 2018 – Saint-Pée-sur-Nivelle to Espelette,  (ITT)

The riders departed northeast, from Saint-Pée-sur-Nivelle, to the first timecheck on the outskirts of Ustaritz. The route then turned south to Souraïde and headed northwest to the second timecheck, before returning through the village. The route was expected to take each rider around 44 minutes.

Stage 21
29 July 2018 – Houilles to Paris (Champs-Élysées), 

The race departed west from Houilles travelling to Maisons-Laffitte. The route then turned southwest to Saint-Germain-en-Laye, northwest to Poissy and then southwest to the western side of Feucherolles. The riders then headed southeast through Chavenay to Villepreux, and continued east through Rocquencourt to Saint-Cloud. The riders then crossed the Bois de Boulogne, to enter Paris at the Porte Maillot, and travelled along the Avenue de la Grande Armée. The race then continued along the Champs-Élysées to the Quai des Tuileries, turned left into the tunnel beneath the Tuileries Garden and then left onto the Rue de Rivoli. The riders then passed through the Place de la Concorde and headed back onto the Champs-Élysées, for the first pass of the finish line. The circuit continued around the Arc de Triomphe and back down the Champs-Élysées. An intermediate sprint took place near the top of the Champs-Élysées, after passing the finish line for the third time. The race ended on the ninth crossing of the finish line.

References

Sources
 

2018 Tour de France
Tour de France stages